Todd Fjelsted is an American production designer and visual artist. He is best known for his work on the Netflix series GLOW and Marvel series Helstrom.

Life and career
Fjelsted was born in Columbus, Ohio and grew up in North Carolina. He started his career as a fine artist exhibitor in galleries. In 2003, he wrote and directed the animated short film, The Firefly Man, screened at the Telluride Film Festival. Later, he moved to Los Angeles in 2003 and worked as an art director and production designer. He is a member of the Art Directors Guild.

Filmography

Film

Television

Awards and nominations

References

External links 
 
 

1967 births
Living people
American art directors
American production designers